Michel Trenchant (born February 1, 1945) is a French retired slalom canoeist who competed in the 1960s and 1970s. He won a bronze medal in the C-1 team event at the 1969 ICF Canoe Slalom World Championships in Bourg St.-Maurice. Trenchant also finished 12th in the C-1 event at the 1972 Summer Olympics in Munich.

References
Sports-reference.com profile

1945 births
Canoeists at the 1972 Summer Olympics
French male canoeists
Living people
Olympic canoeists of France
Medalists at the ICF Canoe Slalom World Championships